Beth Israel Synagogue is a Modern Orthodox synagogue located at 1480 Oxford Street in Halifax, Nova Scotia. Formally chartered by a Private Member's Bill in the Nova Scotia legislature in 1895, it grew out of the Baron de Hirsch Hebrew Benevolent Society (named after Baron Maurice de Hirsch), which was formed in 1890. It was the first Orthodox congregation in Canada east of Montreal, and still provides the only daily minyan in Canada east of Montreal. In 1953, several families from the Beth Israel Synagogue left to form the Shaar Shalom Synagogue. The Beth Israel is also one of the few synagogues in the region with a functioning mikveh

 the rabbi was Yakov Kerzner.

Notes

Buildings and structures in Halifax, Nova Scotia
Culture of Halifax, Nova Scotia
Religious buildings and structures in Nova Scotia
Religious organizations established in 1895
Synagogues in Nova Scotia
19th-century synagogues
Modern Orthodox synagogues in Canada
1895 establishments in Canada
19th-century religious buildings and structures in Canada